Key Witness is a 1947 American film noir crime film directed by D. Ross Lederman and starring John Beal, Trudy Marshall and Jimmy Lloyd.

Plot
A man runs away to avoid suspicion of murder and ends up in more trouble.

Cast
 John Beal as Milton Higby
 Trudy Marshall as Marge Andrews
 Jimmy Lloyd as Larry Summers
 Helen Mowery as Sally Guthrie
 Wilton Graff as Albert Loring
 Barbara Read as Martha Higby
 Charles Trowbridge as John Ballin
 Harry Hayden as Custer Bidwell

Reception

Critical response
When the film was released in 1947, critic Bosley Crowther, was sly in his negative review, "The moral of Key Witness, which came to the Rialto yesterday, it says, is that 'no man can escape trouble by trying to run away from it.' This wisdom is demonstrated in the adventures of a desperate young man who attempts to get out of one involvement by changing his identity—and runs into others thereby ... There might also be drawn this moral from the evidence presented here: you can't often be sure of entertainment from that which is claimed to be."

References

External links
 
 
 
 Key Witness information site and DVD review at DVD Beaver (includes images)
 

1947 films
1940s thriller films
American thriller films
American black-and-white films
Columbia Pictures films
American detective films
1940s English-language films
Film noir
1940s American films
English-language thriller films